Endorf is an Ortschaft (subdivision) of the town of Sundern in the Hochsauerland district of North Rhine-Westphalia, Germany.

Division of the village 
Endorf consists of 8 small villages which together build a subdivision of Sundern:

History 
Endorf was first mentioned in 1191.  In the past, it was agrarian-oriented. It has its blossom of mining in the 18th century.

References

External links
 Official site (German)

Former municipalities in North Rhine-Westphalia
Hochsauerlandkreis